"Mr. Sandman" is a 1954 song written by Pat Ballard.

Mr. Sandman may also refer to:

 Mr. Sandman or The Sandman (wrestler), ring names of retired professional wrestler Jim Fullington (born 1963)
 "Mr. Sandman" (Grimm), an episode of the American television series Grimm
 Mr. Sandman (Punch-Out!!), a character in the Punch-Out!! video game series
"Mr. Sandman", a song on the album Tical by Method Man